Richard Parker Hood (10 June 1881 – 22 November 1954) was an English professional footballer who made 130 appearances in the Football League playing for Lincoln City. He played as a centre half or right back.

Life and career
Hood was born in Seaham, County Durham, and played football for Seaham Rovers before joining Lincoln City. He made his debut in October 1904 in the Football League Second Division. Hood, described by the Daily Express as a "resolute back", and his fellow defenders were instrumental as Lincoln eliminated Chelsea from the 1906–07 FA Cup on their own ground in a first round replay. He remained with the club after they failed to be re-elected to the Football League in 1908, and contributed to their Midland League title in 1908–09, making his final first-team appearance for Lincoln in the last match of that season.

Notes

References

1881 births
1954 deaths
Sportspeople from Seaham
Footballers from County Durham
English footballers
Association football defenders
Lincoln City F.C. players
English Football League players
Midland Football League players